Invermark may mean

 Invermark Castle, a Scottish castle in Angus
 Invermark Lodge, a shooting lodge near the castle
 Invermark (horse), a racehorse named after the lodge